Andrew Adibo Dick (born 11 May 1976 in Abeokuta, Ogun) is an amateur freestyle wrestler from Nigeria, who competes in the men's light heavyweight category. At the age of thirty-six, Dick made his Olympic debut in the 2012 Summer Olympics in London, where he competed in the 84 kg class in men's freestyle wrestling. He lost his first match in the preliminary round to Puerto Rico's Jaime Espinal, with a technical score of 1–9, and a classification score of 1–3. Because Espinal advanced further into the final match against Azerbaijan's Sharif Sharifov, Dick was offered another shot for the bronze medal through the repechage bouts. He withdrew from the competition because of a serious injury, allowing his opponent Dato Marsagishvili of Georgia to qualify directly for the bronze medal bout.

References

External links
FILA Profile

Nigerian male sport wrestlers
1976 births
Living people
Olympic wrestlers of Nigeria
Wrestlers at the 2012 Summer Olympics
Yoruba sportspeople
Sportspeople from Abeokuta
Commonwealth Games medallists in wrestling
Commonwealth Games silver medallists for Nigeria
Commonwealth Games bronze medallists for Nigeria
Wrestlers at the 2010 Commonwealth Games
Wrestlers at the 2014 Commonwealth Games
20th-century Nigerian people
21st-century Nigerian people
Medallists at the 2010 Commonwealth Games
Medallists at the 2014 Commonwealth Games